St Paul's School For Girls is a voluntary aided, comprehensive, girls' school in Edgbaston, Birmingham, UK,

Admissions
It is a Roman Catholic school, and became a specialist school in maths and computing in September 2005. It is ethnically diverse, with a mixture of Black and White English/Irish pupils.

It is situated just north of the A456 and B4125, just south of Edgbaston Reservoir. The school is named after St Paul's Convent, and the headmistresses were nuns until 1998.

History
It was founded on 7 October 1908, from an earlier establishment based on Whittall Street. St Paul's Convent had been founded at Selly Park in 1864. In the 1940s, it became a Grammar School with selective entry based on the 11-plus. In 1975, it became a Comprehensive School.

Part of the school was destroyed by fire in November 1973. Mother Teresa visited on 12 September 1974. In 2010 a new Maths and English building was constructed named 'The Sister Suite' in reference to the nuns who founded the school, certain rooms inside the building were named after notable Sisters in the school's history.

Academic performance
It has relatively high GCSE pass rates for similar schools in the Birmingham LEA and in England. In 2009 it got the second best A-level results for comprehensive schools in Birmingham, with results similar to a grammar school.

Notable former pupils
 Clare Short former Labour MP
 Sarah Smart Actress
 Julie Walters Actress

See also
 Highclare School, an independent school in Sutton Coldfield founded by St Paul's Convent.

References

External links
 St Paul's School for Girls
 Sisters of St Paul Selly Park
 Ofsted

Girls' schools in the West Midlands (county)
Secondary schools in Birmingham, West Midlands
Educational institutions established in 1908
Catholic secondary schools in the Archdiocese of Birmingham
1908 establishments in England
Edgbaston
Voluntary aided schools in England